Slaves' Graves & Ballads is the third album by American experimental rock band Dirty Projectors. It is a combination of two different recordings entitled Slaves' Graves and Ballads, hence the name of the LP combination of the two. The two sessions have drastically different sounds: the first features frontman and guitarist David Longstreth accompanied by a chamber orchestra called The Orchestral Society for the Preservation of the Orchestra; the second features Dave and his guitar recorded by Adam Forkner. On this release tracks 1-7 includes the Slaves' Graves songs while tracks 8-14 constitutes Ballads.

Track listing

Tracks 1-7 recorded in Dwight Chapel, New Haven, CT in December 2002.
Tracks 8-14 recorded at Dub Narcotic Studios, Olympia, WA and Southbury, CT between July and August 2002.
Tracks 4-6 form one continuous suite of songs.

References 

2004 albums
Dirty Projectors albums
Western Vinyl albums
Albums produced by David Longstreth